Cole Harbour is a former village and current community located in Nova Scotia, Canada that is part of the Halifax Regional Municipality.

Geography
It is situated 6 kilometres east of the central business district of Dartmouth and takes its name from Cole Harbour, a natural harbour fronting the Atlantic Ocean.

Cole Harbour is adjacent to and immediately east of the former city boundary of Dartmouth; prior to municipal amalgamation and the creation of the Halifax Regional Municipality in 1995, Cole Harbour was an unincorporated village within the Municipality of the County of Halifax. Because of amalgamation in the Halifax region, Canada Post recognizes most of Cole Harbour's residents as living in neighboring Dartmouth.

Transportation
The centre of Cole Harbour is at the intersection of Forest Hills Parkway and Route 207 (Cole Harbour Road).  A small business district is situated along Route 207 with several residential subdivisions
such as Forest Hills and Colby Village located north and south of this road.

The Forest Hills Parkway links the community to Highway 107, while Cole Harbour Road becomes Portland Street further to the west in Dartmouth and links to Highway 111.

Extensive residential and commercial development took place during the 1970s and 1980s following completion of Highway 111 and the widening of Cole Harbour Road.

Until the mid-1980s, CN Rail operated a rail line from Dartmouth to Upper Musquodoboit with part of the route crossing the southern edge of the community.  The abandoned rail corridor was converted to a rail trail named the Salt Marsh Trail and is part of the Trans Canada Trail.

Schools 
Cole Harbour District High School
Astral Drive Junior High School
Sir Robert Borden Junior High School
Astral Drive Elementary School
Bel Ayr Elementary School
Caldwell Road Elementary School
Colby Village Elementary School
Colonel John Stewart Elementary School
George Bissett Elementary School
Humber Park Elementary School
Joseph Giles Elementary School
Robert Kemp Turner Elementary School

Recreation
 Cole Harbour Place

Sea Cadets
Cole Harbour is home to Royal Canadian Sea Cadet Corps IROQUOIS, recipient of the Convoy Shield for the most proficient Sea Cadet Corps in the Maritime area.

Notable people
 Mike Clattenburg, film director, writer and creator of Trailer Park Boys
 Sidney Crosby, professional hockey player, 3x Stanley Cup Champion and 2x Olympic gold medalist
 Joe DiPenta, professional hockey player, 2007 Stanley Cup Champion
 T. J. Grant, UFC fighter 
 Craig Hillier, professional hockey player
 Nathan MacKinnon, professional hockey player, 2022 Stanley Cup Champion
 Matt Mays, musician and film producer
 John Paul Tremblay, actor
 Robb Wells, actor
 Jason John Whitehead, comedian
 Morgan Williams, international rugby player

References

Communities in Halifax, Nova Scotia